Edwin James Barclay (5 January 1882 – 6 November 1955) was a Liberian politician, poet, and musician who served as the 18th president of Liberia from 1930 until 1944. He was a member of the True Whig political party, which dominated the political governance of the country for decades. Under Barclay's leadership, Liberia was an ally of the United States during World War II.

Early life 
Edwin Barclay's paternal grandparents moved from Barbados to Liberia with their children in 1865. They were among a minority of immigrants from the Caribbean but shared with the Americo-Liberians a culture with an English base, considerable mixed-race ancestry, and a shared history. Edwin's father, Ernest Barclay, and uncle, Arthur Barclay, became important politicians in Liberia.

In 1901, at the age of 19, Edwin wrote a Liberian patriotic song, "The Lone Star Forever." Barclay and his wife Euphemia had three children. In addition, they fostered future Liberian Ambassador to the U.S., George Arthur Padmore (1915–2005).

He had three children: Mary Barclay Dumbar, Siata Isabel Barclay, and Earnest Barclay.

Career
Edwin Barclay, a member of the True Whig Party which ruled at that time, served as secretary of state of Liberia in the government of Charles D. B. King from 1920 until 1930. He became President of Liberia in 1930 when President King and Vice President Allen Yancy resigned after being implicated by a League of Nations investigation as having profited from forced labor. He was elected in his own right for the first time in 1931.

Presidency (1930–44)
Barclay was selected to complete King's term as president. One of his first official decisions was to repeal the famous Port of Entry Law of 1864 that had restricted the economic activities of foreigners in the country. Subsequently, in the early 1930s concession agreements were signed between the Liberian Government and Dutch, Danish, German and Polish investors. Barclay is credited with helping the country survive some of Liberia's greatest threats to its sovereignty in that country's history. These included threats by the League of Nations led by the German, British and American governments to occupy the country unless reforms were made, aggressive diplomatic intrigues by France and a coup attempt by the Firestone Tire and Rubber Company which owned much of Liberia's land.

Renegotiation of loan payments
In 1926, the Liberian government had granted a major rubber concession to the Firestone Tire and Rubber company and undertook to borrow $5 million from a Firestone subsidiary.

The Great Depression of the 1930s brought Liberia to the verge of bankruptcy. As the global economy collapsed, so too did prices of all commodities, including those for rubber. By 1932, rubber prices had fallen to a low of 3¢ a pound. Although the trees planted by the Firestone Company in 1926 and 1927 were reaching tapping age, the market price of rubber would cover only a small fraction of the cost of tapping, processing and transportation to market. Firestone did not bother to harvest and produce the rubber. Without this revenue, government revenues fell steadily to a low of $321,000 in 1933.

By 1931, it became apparent to the Liberian administration that the revenue shortfall made continued loan repayments impossible. The government asked the lending bank and Firestone for forbearance on the loan payments but to no avail. Harvey Firestone attempted to persuade the United States government to employ "gunboat diplomacy" to compel compliance with the loan agreement. U.S. President Franklin D. Roosevelt refused to interfere in Liberian internal affairs, writing in a memorandum to the State Department: "At all times we should remember that (Harvey) Firestone went to Liberia at his own financial risk, and it is not the business of the State Department to pull his financial chestnut out of the fire except as a friend of the Liberian people."

In 1932, the Liberian Legislature passed the Moratorium Act suspending payment of the Firestone loan until terms could be negotiated that were more in line with Liberia's ability to pay. The US suspended diplomatic relations but did not take further action.

When Barclay appealed to the League of Nations for help, the Council of the League of Nations established a commission of inquiry. The report of the commission recommended providing financial aid to Liberia with certain conditions that reflected concerns that the government of Liberia would not be able to pay a renegotiated loan without some level of monitoring. Some European powers in the League of Nations had advocated mandate status for Liberia, a move which would have abrogated the independence of the republic.

Barclay and other members of his cabinet objected to the proposed conditions on the grounds that they would infringe upon the sovereignty of Liberia. For example, one of the conditions would have required that the League's delegates be placed in key positions within the Liberian government.

After Barclay implemented some of the measures that had been proposed by the League of Nations, U.S. President Franklin Roosevelt restored diplomatic relations with Liberia in 1934. After three years of negotiation, an agreement was reached along lines suggested by the League. Two key League officials were placed in positions to advise the government, but with limitations set forth by the Liberian government. With this assistance program in place, Liberia was able to resume making loan payments.

World War II

In 1937 President Barclay, under pressure from the United States, withdrew the concession agreement with the German investors, who were accused of sympathies with the Nazi regime in their home country. Until 3 January 1944, Barclay was Liberian President, to be succeeded by William Tubman.

Strategic importance of Liberia
After the fall of Malaysia and Singapore to the Japanese during World War II, Liberia became very strategically important as its rubber plantation was the only source of natural latex rubber available to the Allies, apart from plantations in Ceylon (now Sri Lanka). Among many other uses, natural rubber was needed to build tires for war planes, military jeeps, aircraft guns, and sensitive radar equipment. As a result of the simultaneous sharp increase in demand and drastic reduction in supply, prices soared for natural rubber in the United States and measures were taken to reduce demand.

Writing in his memoirs, former U.S. Secretary of State Cordell Hull wrote, "With Japan's occupation of the Rubber producing areas in the Far East, Liberia became of greatly increased importance to us as one of the few remaining available sources of natural rubber." President Barclay assured the Americans that Liberia would supply all the natural rubber that the United States and its allies needed for the war effort.

Defense Pact with the United States (1942)

In 1942 Liberia signed a Defense Pact with the United States. This commenced a period of strategic development, including the construction of roads, airports and other infrastructure projects. Robertsfield Airport was built with runways long enough for B-47 Stratojet bombers to land for refueling, giving Liberia the longest runway in Africa to this day.

Provision of war supplies to the North African theater

The provision of war supplies to the North African theater was difficult, expensive, and time-consuming. German U-boats had taken complete control of the North Atlantic Ocean routes, making shipping in the North Atlantic Ocean hazardous to American warships and merchant vessels. In order to transport American soldiers and war supplies to North Africa, the United States needed to open up a South American-Liberian air corridor.

Because of its proximity to South America, Liberia became the first major West African bridgehead for the South Atlantic air ferry route. For this reason, the Liberian Government also granted to the United States use of its territory to store war supplies and to construct military bases in Montserrado County and Grand Cape Mount County at Fisherman's Lake. United States military supplies were collected in Florida, transported through South America to Brazil, then flown from Brazil to the military depot at Roberts Field. There 5,000 United States African-American troops stored and maintained the inventory. From Roberts Field, the war supplies were flown to their final destinations in Morocco, Tunisia and Algeria.

Franklin Roosevelt's visit to Liberia (1943)

Liberia's strategic importance to the Allied war effort was evidenced by the fact that, in January 1943, U.S. President Franklin D. Roosevelt traveled to Liberia after participating in the Casablanca Conference in order to secure Liberia's support.  Roosevelt's objectives were to negotiate the establishment of U.S. military bases in Liberia, secure Liberia's commitment to continue supplying the U.S. with natural rubber, urge the Liberian government to expel German citizens and persuade it to abandon its neutrality and declare war on the Axis powers.

In May 1943, Edwin Barclay visited the United States. He was the first black man to be officially introduced from the rostrum of the United States Congress as a guest of honor.

Retirement
Barclay retired in 1944 and was replaced by William Tubman. He ran against Tubman in the 1955 presidential election, but received only about 1100 votes. He died a few months later.

See also

 History of Liberia
 Americo-Liberians
 President of Liberia

References

Americo-Liberian people
1882 births
1955 deaths
Liberian people of Barbadian descent
Foreign Ministers of Liberia
Presidents of Liberia
World War II political leaders
True Whig Party politicians
20th-century Liberian politicians
Grand Crosses of the Order of Saint-Charles